Kasidech Wettayawong (born 21 January 1994), is a Thai professional footballer who plays as a winger for Thai League 1 club Ratchaburi.

International career
In February 2015 Kasidech was called up by Kiatisuk Senamuang to play for Thailand in the 2015 King's Cup.

Honours

Club
Muangthong United
 Thai League 1 : 2012

International
Thailand U-19
 AFF U-19 Youth Championship : 2011

References

External links
 Profile at Goal

1994 births
Living people
Kasidech Wettayawong
Kasidech Wettayawong
Association football midfielders
Kasidech Wettayawong
Kasidech Wettayawong
Kasidech Wettayawong
Kasidech Wettayawong
Kasidech Wettayawong
Kasidech Wettayawong
Kasidech Wettayawong
Kasidech Wettayawong
Kasidech Wettayawong
Kasidech Wettayawong
Kasidech Wettayawong